The Caviar Princess is a 1930 German silent comedy film directed by Carl Lamac and starring Anny Ondra, Maria Forescu and André Roanne. The film's art direction was by Heinrich Richter. It is also known by the alternative title The Virgin of Paris.

Cast
 Anny Ondra as Annemarie
 Maria Forescu as Ihre Tante
 André Roanne as Attaché
 Albert Paulig as Minister
 Ida Wüst as seine Frau
 Josef Rovenský as Jazzsänger
 Hans Mierendorff as Finanzmagnet
 Paul Rehkopf as Schutzmann
 Sig Arno as Dorfbursche
 Carl Walther Meyer as Journalist

References

Bibliography
Prawer, S.S. Between Two Worlds: The Jewish Presence in German and Austrian Film, 1910–1933. Berghahn Books, 2005.

External links

1930 films
Films of the Weimar Republic
1930 comedy films
German silent feature films
German comedy films
Films directed by Karel Lamač
German black-and-white films
Silent comedy films
1930s German films
1930s German-language films